Electra 2000 is the second studio album by the American alternative rock band Hum. Originally released in 1993 by 12 Inch Records, the first run was limited to 1,000 copies had the band's name printed in black lettering. The album also included "Monty Python Organ Grinder," an instrumental Monty Python song included as a secret track. The second release contains the same track listing as the first, but slightly different cover art, with red lettering rather than black. The album was released for a third time in 1997 by Martians Go Home  and contains "Diffuse" as the final track. The song was recorded during the Electra 2000 sessions, but was initially released on the various artists compilation Feast of the Sybarites.

A music video was produced for "Iron Clad Lou."

Critical reception
In a retrospective review, Tiny Mix Tapes called Electra 2000 "the group’s heaviest and most relentless album." Trouser Press called the album "bracingly loud but generically obvious in its attack: simple melodies kicked along with a brisk backbeat and covered in sizzling sensual guitar aggression."

Track listing
All tracks written by Hum.

"Iron Clad Lou" – 5:51
"Pinch & Roll" – 3:26
"Shovel" – 4:30
"Pewter" – 4:09
"Scraper" – 3:20
"Firehead" – 3:30
"Sundress" – 3:57
"Double Dip" – 5:16
"Winder" – 14:18

On the original release "Winder" lasts 5:44, with a hidden track, "Monty Python Organ Grinder", beginning at 6:08. This was omitted from subsequent pressings.

Re-release bonus track
"Diffuse" – 4:34

Personnel
Hum
Jeff Dimpsey – bass guitar
Tim Lash – guitar
Bryan St. Pere – drums
Matt Talbott – guitar, vocals

Additional personnel
Andy Hodge – artwork
Mike Starcevich – photography
Brad Wood – engineering, mixing, production

References

External links
Twelve Inch Records on Electra 2000

1993 albums
Albums produced by Brad Wood
Hum (band) albums